Drought Cycle is the name given to the "drought novels cycle," a Brazilian literary era that had as main theme the life in the Brazilian backlands.

It began with the publication of O sertanejo of José de Alencar (1876), and lasted until the first decade of the twentieth century. The main characters of the drought cycle literature are bandits, migrants and blesseds. In the cycle stand the Ceará writers.
 "Os sertões was a landmark, work of sociology, literature and war story, written by Euclides da Cunha with obvious admiration for the country people, understanding their struggles against nature and protest against the contempt with which handles the federal government."
Gilberto Freyre was influenced by this literary tendency. Other relevant authors are Raquel de Queirós, José Lins do Rego, Jorge Amado, Graciliano Ramos, Antônio Callado, until Guimarães Rosa.

See also 
Brazilian literature
Agreste
Sertão
Caatinga

References

Further reading

Nonfiction
Michael H. Glantz; Currents of Change : El Niño's Impact on Climate and Society; published 1996 by Cambridge University Press. 
Michael H. Glantz (editor); Drought Follows The Plow: Cultivating Marginal Areas; published 1994 by Cambridge University Press. 
Fagan, Brian; Floods, Famines, and Emperors: El Niño and the Fate of Civilizations; published 2000 by Basic Books. 
Nicholas G. Arons; Waiting for Rain: The Politics and Poetry of Drought in Northeast Brazil; published 2004 by University of Arizona Press. 
Euclides da Cunha, Rebellion in the Backlands

Fiction
Graciliano Ramos, Vidas Secas ("Barren Lives"), novel

Brazilian literature
Northeast Region, Brazil
Climate of Brazil
Droughts
19th-century Brazilian literature
20th-century Brazilian literature